This is a list of places on the Victorian Heritage Register in the Shire of Loddon in Victoria, Australia. The Victorian Heritage Register is maintained by the Heritage Council of Victoria.

The Victorian Heritage Register, as of 2020, lists the following 13 state-registered places within the Shire of Loddon:

References

Loddon
Shire of Loddon